Antoni Cerdan (born 1955) is a Catalan painter and sculptor.

Cerdan studied drawing and painting with Domènec Fita, an artist from Girona, and later at the Barcelona School of Fine Arts.

His work varies between painting, sculpture and engraving. The sea is a very common theme in his work.

Permanent work in public places 
Sculpture "On the same horizon" at the Blanes promenade.
Painting on the street at Setè (France).
Painting The sea and me (El Mar, la mar i jo) at Blanes Teather.

References 

1955 births
Living people